The Dominican Republic competed at the 1988 Summer Olympics in Seoul, South Korea.

Competitors
The following is the list of number of competitors in the Games.

Results by event

Athletics
Modesto Castillo
Juan Núñez
Evaristo Ortíz

Boxing
Jesús Beltre
Melvin de Leon
Pedro Fria
José Saizozema
Emilio Villegas

Judo
Gilberto García

Table Tennis
Blanca Alejo
Mario Álvarez
Raymundo Fermín

Weightlifting
Francisco Guzman
José Miguel Guzman
Frank Pérez
Cristian Rivera

References

Official Olympic Reports

Nations at the 1988 Summer Olympics
1988
Oly